The Quebec Aces, also known in French as Les As de Québec, were an amateur and later a professional men's ice hockey team from Quebec City, Quebec.

History
The Aces were founded in 1928 by Anglo-Canadian Pulp and Paper Mills, the name Aces standing for Anglo-Canadian Employees with an s to form a plural. The French name was added later. The Aces played until 1971, from 1930 on playing home games at the Quebec Coliseum.  Most notable of the Aces' players was the legendary Jean Béliveau, who played for the Quebec Aces in 1951-52 and 1952-53.

The Aces were Allan Cup champions in 1944, while still playing as an amateur team. The Aces turned professional the following season, joining the Quebec Senior Hockey League (1944–1953), Quebec Hockey League (1953–1959) and American Hockey League (1959–1971).

The Aces were league champions of the Quebec Hockey League in 1953–54 and 1956–57, winning the Thomas O'Connell Memorial Trophy. The Aces challenged for the Edinburgh Trophy both seasons, versus the Western Hockey League champions, losing in 1953–54 versus the Calgary Stampeders, and winning in 1956–57 versus the Brandon Regals. (Stott, Jon C. Ice Warriors: The Pacific Coast/Western Hockey League 1948-74, pp. 58, 82)

During the team's later years in the AHL, the Aces were the farm club for the Philadelphia Flyers four seasons from 1967 to 1971, giving the early Flyers teams a strong Quebec presence with players such as Andre Lacroix, Jean-Guy Gendron, Simon Nolet, Serge Bernier and Rosaire Paiement, all former Aces. The Flyers also owned the "Junior Aces" team which played in the Quebec Junior Hockey League since the 1964–65 season. The Flyers sold the junior team's assets in 1969 to group who founded the Quebec Remparts. Paul Dumont, served as the general manager of the Junior Aces. In 1971, the Flyers chose to relocate their farm team to Richmond, Virginia. The Aces became the Richmond Robins for the 1971–72 season. Not a year later, the group who owned the Remparts bought a World Hockey Association franchise from San Francisco and moved it to Quebec City to become the Quebec Nordiques which started in 1972 and in 1979, the team moved to the National Hockey League until 1995 when the team moved to Denver, Colorado to become the Colorado Avalanche.

The Aces name was revived by a team from the Ligue nord-américaine de hockey from 1997 to 1998, and 2001 to 2003. The team relocated in 2007 and is now known as Pont Rouge Lois Jeans.

Season-by-season results
 1928–1936 (Quebec City Railway-Paper League)
 1936–1941 (Montreal Senior Group, QAHA)
 1941–1953 (Quebec Senior Hockey League)
 1953–1959 (Quebec Hockey League)
 1959–1971 (American Hockey League)

Regular season
Some results unavailable from 1928 to 1944.

† From 1936–39, Quebec played some 4-point games against Victorias and McGill.
1936-41: Source: Ottawa Citizen, 1943–44: Ottawa Citizen

Playoffs
American Hockey League seasons only.

†One game tiebreaker to determine final playoff position.

References

External links
 Quebec Aces history website

 
Senior ice hockey teams
Ice hockey clubs established in 1928
Ice hockey clubs disestablished in 1971
1928 establishments in Quebec
1971 disestablishments in Quebec
Boston Bruins minor league affiliates
Philadelphia Flyers minor league affiliates